Albert S. Howson (3 February 1881 – 2 August 1960) was an American actor and head of the censorship department of Warner Brothers who lived in Forest Hills Gardens, Queens. He made his stage debut in New York in 1898 and appeared in 21 Broadway plays spanning 30 years, as well as seven films during World War I. Notable roles include Kassim Baba in the original Broadway production of Chu Chin Chow. He also wrote the 1927 silent film Matinee Ladies.

Howson, whose middle name has been reported as Sidney or Sydney, was a nephew of Australian opera singer Emma Howson of the Howson family.

Selected filmography
The Better Man (1914)
The Vampire (1915)
My Madonna (1915)

External links 
"Who's who in Music and Drama: An Encyclopedia of Biography of Notable Men and Women in Music and the Drama" by Harry Prescott Hanaford and Dixie Hines, H.P. Hanaford, 1914
"Albert S. Howson, Ex-Stage Actor, 79", New York Times obituary, August 3, 1960

American male stage actors
1881 births
1960 deaths
Male actors from New York City
People from Queens, New York
American male screenwriters
American male film actors
20th-century American male actors
Screenwriters from New York (state)
20th-century American male writers
20th-century American screenwriters